The Banff International String Quartet Competition is held once in three years at the  Banff Centre for Arts and Creativity in Banff, Alberta, Canada.

History
The competition was organized in 1983 by Kenneth Murphy to celebrate the 50th anniversary of the Banff Centre for the Arts, at which he was the assistant artistic director for musical programs.  It is now recognised as one of the world's major string quartet competitions.

Competition details

Ten quartets from around the world are selected to take part in the semi-final competition. All members of the quartets must be under the age of 35.  After playing various styles of both traditional and modern chamber music before audiences over a period of several days, three finalist groups are chosen.  After further performances these are judged and a winner chosen.

Each year the winning ensemble receives a cash prize and a three-year career development programme, including a recording session at Banff Centre and a performance tour of European and North American cities.  There is also a cash prize for second place and smaller specific prizes.

Winners

In 2010, the Cecilia String Quartet of Toronto took the top prize in the competition.

The winner of the 2013 competition was the Dover Quartet, an American ensemble.

In 2016 the winner of the competition was the Rolston String Quartet.

In 2019, the First Prize was, for the first time, shared between two groups: the Marmen Quartet (UK) and the Viano String Quartet (Canada/USA). The Second Prize was awarded to the Callisto Quartet (USA).

In 2022 the winner of the competition was the Isidore String Quartet.

References

External links
 

Music competitions in Canada
Festivals in Banff, Alberta